The Women's points race competition at the 2020 UCI Track Cycling World Championships was held on 1 March 2020.

Results
The race was started at 14:02. 100 (25 km) laps were raced with 10 sprints.

References

Women's points race
UCI Track Cycling World Championships – Women's points race